E. Allison Hagood, known professionally as Allison Hagood, (born July 20, 1966) is an American Professor of psychology and author with a background in the diagnosis and treatment of adult mental disorders (with a specialization in schizophrenia), cognitive psychology, life-span development, and neuroscience. Hagood recently coauthored a book on the vaccine controversy, providing information to support a parent's decision to vaccinate their children, entitled Your Baby's Best Shot: Why Vaccines Are Safe and Save Lives.

Biography
Allison Hagood was born in Easley, South Carolina in 1966. She earned a Bachelor of Arts in Psychology at Harvard University and a Master of Arts in Clinical Psychology from the University of Colorado. During her graduate studies at the University of Colorado, Hagood co-authored an article on the importance of faculty mentoring for junior faculty. Hagood is currently Professor of Psychology at Arapahoe Community College in Littleton, Colorado.

Vaccine book
Hagood and co-author Stacy Mintzer Herlihy, along with a foreword by Paul A. Offit, one of the leading experts on vaccines, published Your Baby's Best Shot: Why Vaccines Are Safe and Save Lives in 2012. According to the book's description, the book was written for parents who lack a scientific or medical background and who might be confused by the conflicting information in the ongoing vaccine controversy. The book attempts to convince parents that vaccines are safe and efficacious, and argues that some fears, such as the belief that vaccines cause autism, are not scientifically supported. Reviews of the book have been generally favorable, with one considering it thoroughly researched and might even convince those who are opposed to vaccines to vaccinate their children. Another review in Parents Magazine observed that the book could be a great resource for parents who are preparing to vaccinate their children.

Bibliography

References

External links
Your Baby's Best Shot Facebook Page

American medical writers
Women medical writers
1966 births
Living people
Harvard College alumni
People from Easley, South Carolina
Writers from South Carolina
21st-century American non-fiction writers
21st-century American women writers
University of Colorado alumni
American women non-fiction writers
Vaccination advocates